Red Level is a town in Covington County, Alabama, United States. At the 2020 census, the population was 432.

Geography

Demographics

Red Level first appeared on the 1910 U.S. Census, having incorporated as a town in 1901. In 1960, it was erroneously reported as having 327 residents. This was due to an error which placed almost half of the residents outside the town limits, it was afterwards adjusted to 617 residents.

2000 census
As of the census of 2000, there were 556 people, 213 households, and 151 families residing in the town. The racial makeup of the town was 88.67% White, 10.07% Black or African American, 0.18% Native American, 0.54% from other races, and 0.54% from two or more races.

There were 213 households, out of which 33.8% had children under the age of 18 living with them, 54.5% were married couples living together, 11.7% had a female householder with no husband present, and 29.1% were non-families. 28.2% of all households were made up of individuals, and 15.5% had someone living alone who was 65 years of age or older. The average household size was 2.55 and the average family size was 3.09.

In the town, the population was spread out, with 26.4% under the age of 18, 7.9% from 18 to 24, 26.3% from 25 to 44, 22.3% from 45 to 64, and 17.1% who were 65 years of age or older. The median age was 36 years. For every 100 females, there were 102.9 males. For every 100 females age 18 and over, there were 101.5 males.

The median income for a household in the town was $25,956, and the median income for a family was $36,250. Males had a median income of $25,833 versus $18,750 for females. The per capita income for the town was $14,491. About 11.0% of families and 16.5% of the population were below the poverty line, including 22.3% of those under age 18 and 20.0% of those age 65 or over.

2020 census

As of the 2020 United States census, there were 432 people, 159 households, and 107 families residing in the town.

Notable people

 Eugene Crum Foshee, Alabama state legislator, was born in Red Level.
 Q. V. Lowe, head baseball coach for Auburn University at Montgomery
 Luther Terry, Surgeon General of the United States when Smoking and Health: Report of the Advisory Committee to the Surgeon General of the United States was released, leading to tobacco packaging warning messages
 Willie Tyler, ventriloquist and entertainer, born in Red Level

Joel N. Phillips,
RLHS Track-star,  Alabama state 110 meter hurdle Champion 2019.

References 

Towns in Covington County, Alabama
Towns in Alabama